Goetz von Berlichingen of the Iron Hand is a 1979 German-Yugoslavian historical adventure film directed by Wolfgang Liebeneiner and starring Raimund Harmstorf, Michèle Mercier, and Sky du Mont. It is an adaptation of the 1773 play Götz von Berlichingen by Johann Wolfgang von Goethe.

The film's sets were designed by the art director Nino Borghi. Location shooting took place around various sites in Salzburg and in Zagreb in Croatia.

Main cast

References

Bibliography

External links 
 

1979 films
1970s historical adventure films
German historical adventure films
West German films
1970s German-language films
Films directed by Wolfgang Liebeneiner
Films directed by Harald Reinl
German films based on plays
Films based on works by Johann Wolfgang von Goethe
Films set in the 16th century
Films set in the Holy Roman Empire
Constantin Film films
Yugoslav historical adventure films
1970s German films